is the third released single by the J-pop group NYC. It was released on March 9, 2011 two days before the 2011 Tōhoku earthquake and tsunami. The single was certified Gold by Recording Industry Association of Japan.

Single information
It was released in three versions: a Limited CD+DVD A Edition, a Limited CD+DVD B Edition, and a Regular CD only Edition. The title song was used as the ending theme of anime film “Nintama Rantaro Ninjutsu Gakuen Zenin Shutsudou no Dan“.

Limited A includes the promotional video of the song while the Limited B includes the PV of their first single Yūki 100%. The Regular edition contains three tracks including Yume Tamago and their original Karaokes.

Track listing

Limited Edition A
 CD
 Yume Tamago
 Yume Tamago (Original Karaoke)
 DVD
 Yume Tamago (PV)
 Yume Tamago PV Making

Limited Edition B
 CD
 Yume Tamago
 Yume Tamago (Original Karaoke)
  DVD
 Yuuki 100% (PV)
 Yuuki 100% PV Making

Regular Edition
 CD
 Yume Tamago
 Kimi to Itsumo
 Seishun Kippu
 Yume Tamago (Original Karaoke)
 Kimi to Itsumo (Original Karaoke)
 Seishun Kippu (Original Karaoke)

Charts

Sales and certifications

Release History

References

External links
"Yume Tamago" product information 
"Yume Tamago" Oricon profile 

2011 singles
J-pop songs
Billboard Japan Hot 100 number-one singles
Japanese film songs
Songs written for animated films
Song articles with missing songwriters